The 2019–20 FC Basel season was the 126th season in the club's history and the 25th consecutive season in the top flight of Swiss football following their promotion in the 1993–94 season. The domestic league season started on the weekend of 19–21 July 2019. Basel were runners-up in the previous Super League season and were therefore qualified for 2019–20 UEFA Champions League second qualifying round. Basel competed in round 1 of the 2019–20 Swiss Cup on 17 August 2019.

Club

Management 
Marcel Koller was the first team manager, Thomas Janeschitz and Carlos Bernegger were his assistants and Massimo Colomba was Goalkeeper Coach.

Further information 

The FC Basel 125th annual general meeting took place on Tuesday 4 June 2019. The board of directors under president Bernhard Burgener were sport director Marco Streller, financial manager Peter von Büren, marketing manager Patrick Jost, as well as the three directors Reto Baumgartner, Dominik Donzé and Benno Kaiser who remained on the board. Roland Heri was voted onto the board as chief executive director. On 14 June Streller quit his job as sportdirector. On 20 June Ruedi Zbinden was named as his successor.

 Ruedi Zbinden from 20 June 2019

Overview

Offseason and preseason
Manager Marcel Koller had a two-year contract. He was nearly fired by sport director Marco Streller, but the club owner and chairman Bernhard Burgener did not agree so Streller quit his job and Koller continued as manager. There were only a few changes in the squad during the summer break. Omar Alderete was signed in from Huracán, Edon Zhegrova was on loan from Genk and Arthur Cabral was first loaned and then taken over from Palmeiras Marek Suchý and Serey Dié left the club due to end of contract. Dimitri Oberlin was loaned out to Empoli, Aldo Kalulu to Swansea City and Dominik Schmid to Wil until the end of the season. Soon after the season started on 8 August Albian Ajeti was sold to West Ham United.

The Campaign

Domestic League
The season started on the weekend of 20–21 July 2019. Basel's priority aim for the new season is to win the league championship. The season started out well, despite the fact that Basel lost their first home game at St. Jakob-Park against St. Gallen, after 11 rounds they were leading the table having won eight of these rounds. There after, however, they were defeated in three consecutive away games and thus slipped to second position in the table before the winter break. At the start of the second half of season the team suffered two straight off defeats against reigning Swiss champions Young Boys and the team St. Gallen who then rose to the top of the league table. Following a home defeat against bottom of the table Thun, Basel lost contact to the top two teams. On 28 February Swiss Football League postponed all Super and Challenge League matches of matchdays 24, 25 and 26. Postponement came after the Swiss Federal Council banned all major events until 15 March due to the COVID-19 outbreak.

On 13 March Super and Challenge League football was halted until mid June. Following this COVID-19 break Basel could not close the gap to the table top and therefore ended their season in third position, 14 points behind defending champions Young Boys who successfully retained the title.

Arthur Cabral was the team's top league goal scorer, he netted 14 goals. Kemal Ademi was the team's second best league goal scorer with 13, Fabian Frei scored 10 goals and Valentin Stocker netted eight. Fabian Frei and Eray Cömert were the two players with the most appearances, they both played 33 of the 36 league matches. Goalkeeper Jonas Omlin and the two defenders Silvan Widmer and Taulant Xhaka each played 32 league matches.

Domestic Cup
Basel's clear aim for the cup is to win the title. The first round of the Swiss Cup was played on the week-end 16/17/18 August. Up until the quarter finals the home advantage was granted to the team from the lower league. Basel play their first-round game on 18 August away from home against sixth tier Pully Football. Despite a straight red card against Raoul Petretta Basel won the game by four goals to one. In round 2 Basel were drawn away against FC Meyrin. Basel won 3–0 and advanced to the next round. In round 3 Basel were drawn away against Stade Lausanne, Basel won this game 2–1 and advanced to the quarter-final. The quarter-final against Lausanne-Sport was originally scheduled for 3 March, but eventually played on 14 June. Shortly after half time Cabral scored twice to put Basel two up, but Andi Zeqiri and Joël Geissmann put Lausanne level. In the 105th minute Silvan Widmer scored and Basel won the game 3–2 after extra time.

The semi-final was fixed for 25 August and Basel were drawn at home in the St. Jakob-Park against lower tier Winterthur. This was the club's first home game in the cup for two years. Basel started well into the game, capitain Valentin Stocker and Silvan Widmer put Basel two up after just five minutes, then Ricky van Wolfswinkel added a third after 22 minutes. The former Basel player Roman Buess managed to pull a goal back before half time. In the second half Afimico Pululu, again Van Wolfswinkel and Fabian Frei managed three more goals to make it a definitive 6–1 win. The final was played on 30 August in the Stadion Wankdorf in Bern and the opponents were BSC Young Boys. Basel took a lead through Omar Alderete before half time, but Jean-Pierre Nsame equalised after the half time break. In the last minute of the match Marvin Spielmann scored the winner. Basel were defeated.

Champions League
Basel were qualified for the 2019–20 UEFA Champions League in the qualifying phase (League Path) in the second qualifying round. Here they were drawn against PSV Eindhoven from the Netherlands and won on the away goals rule after the two games ended with a 4–4 aggregate score.

After winning the second qualifying round, Basel qualified for the third qualifying round. The draw for this round was held on 22 July 2019 and Basel were drawn against Austrian team LASK. But Basel lost both legs and were knocked out of the competition.

Europa League
Following their elimination in the UEFA Champions League qualifying phase, Basel were qualified for the Europa League group stage. Here they were drawn into group C together with Russian team Krasnodar, Turkish team Trabzonspor and the Spanish team Getafe. Basel won their three group home games, they also won the match in Spain, drew the away match in Turkey but were defeated in their match in Russia. With 13 points they were top place in the group and therefore advanced to the knockout phase as seeded team.

The Round of 32 started on 20 February 2020 and the draw gave them the first leg in Nicosia against APOEL. Raoul Petretta scored Basel's first after 16 minutes, Valentin Stocker added a second eight minutes into the second half and Arthur Cabral scored in the 66th minute to give them a 3–0 victory. It was a comfortable night for the visitors who capitalised on some poor defending from the hosts to take a commanding lead back to Switzerland. The return match was one week later in the St. Jakob-Park. In the 38th minute Fabian Frei converted the penalty given after Nicholas Ioannou had fouled captain Valentin Stocker. This remained as end-result and Basel won 4–0 on aggregate. In the Round of 16 Basel were drawn in the first leg with an away match in Germany against Eintracht Frankfurt and was won 3–0, the goals coming from Samuele Campo, Kevin Bua and Fabian Frei. The second leg, originally scheduled to be played on 19 March 2020, 21:00 CET in Basel, was meant to be played at Waldstadion, but was indefinitely postponed due to an outbreak of COVID-19 in Switzerland. The match was rescheduled on 17 June to 6 August. Eventually it took place on 6 August 2020. Fabian Frei scored the only goal of the match and Basel won 4–0 on aggregate.

On 17 June 2020, UEFA announced that due to the COVID-19 pandemic in Europe, the final stages of the competition would feature a format change. The quarter-finals, semi-finals and final would be played in a single-leg format from 10 to 21 August 2020 in the German cities of Cologne, Düsseldorf, Duisburg and Gelsenkirchen. The matches were tentatively played behind closed doors. Basel were drawn against Shakhtar Donetsk and was played in the Arena AufSchalke in Gelsenkirchen. Shakhtar Donetsk took an early lead, Júnior Moraes in the second minute and Taison doubled up in the 22nd. Late in the second half Alan Patrick added a third, 75th minute from the penalty spot, and in the 88th minute Dodô made in four. During added time Ricky van Wolfswinkel pulled a goal back, but the result was explicit. Shakhtar Donetsk advanced to the semi-finals, but were defeated here by Inter Milan.

Players

First team squad 
The following is the list of the Basel first team squad. It also includes players that were in the squad the day the season started on 19 July 2019 but subsequently left the club after that date.

Other players under contract

Out on loan

Transfers summer 2018

In

Out

Results and fixtures 
Kickoff times are in CET.

Legend

Friendly matches

Preseason

Winter break

Swiss Super League

First half of season

Second half of season

Final league table

Swiss Cup 

The draw for the first round was held in June 2018. The Super League and Challenge League clubs were seeded and could not be drawn against each other. The lower division teams were granted home advantage and Basel were therefore drawn away. The home advantage was also granted to the team from the lower league in the second and third rounds.

UEFA Champions League

Qualifying phase 

Basel were qualified for the 2019–20 UEFA Champions League in the qualifying phase (League Path) in the second qualifying round. The draw for this round was held on 19 June 2019.

After winning the second qualifying round, Basel qualified for the third qualifying round. The draw for this round was held on 22 July 2019.

UEFA Europa League

Group stage 

Following their elimination in the UEFA Champions League qualifying phase, Basel were qualified for the Europa League group stage.

Group C matches

Group C table

Knockout phase

Round of 32

Round of 16

Quarter-finals

See also
 History of FC Basel
 List of FC Basel players
 List of FC Basel seasons

Notes

References

Sources
 Die ersten 125 Jahre / 2018. Publisher: Josef Zindel im Friedrich Reinhardt Verlag, Basel. 
 Season 2018–19 at "Basler Fussballarchiv” homepage
 Switzerland 2019–20 at RSSSF

External links
 FC Basel official site

Basel
FC Basel seasons
Basel